Georg Meistermann (June 16, 1911 – June 12, 1990) was a German painter and draftsman who was also famous for his stained glass windows in the whole of Europe.

From 1930, Meistermann studied art at the Kunstakademie Düsseldorf under Werner Heuser, Heinrich Nauen and Ewald Mataré, but in 1933 the Nazis condemned this sort of art, and he could not continue his studies. Therefore, he worked as an independent painter and art teacher in Solingen for some years.

Influenced by late Cubism and Alfred Manessier, he created abstract paintings, but he also produced portraits and wall paintings. Beginning in 1937 he made stained glass windows, immersing private, public and church rooms in colored light in an innovative manner, based on an interaction of color, form and line, for which he would become famous. "To bring the colour to floating, to detect meditative spaces and to conquer a depth of the painting directed towards transcendence has been his artistic programme." One example, installed in 1957, is to be found in Berlin's Kaiser-Friedrich-Gedächtniskirche. In 1976, he designed four windows for the Collegio Teutonico, Rome. Another important work is his new design for St. Gereon's Basilica, Cologne (1979-1986), which he called "my religious testament and climax of my lifework". The Stained Glass Association of America considers Meistermann "the most versatile German stained glass designer".
 
In 1953 the artist was appointed professor at the Städelschule, Frankfurt am Main. From 1955 to 1959 he hold a professorship at the Kunstakademie Düsseldorf, and from 1960 to 1976 he was a professor at the Staatliche Akademie der Bildenden Künste Karlsruhe. Among his students at the Düsseldorf Academy were Gotthard Graubner, Raimund Girke and HA Schult. Among his students at the Karlsruhe Academy were Gerold Bursian, Wolfgang Glöckler, Otto Mindhoff, K.J. Overkott and Hans-Günther van Look.

Meistermann participated at the documentas I (1955) and II (1959) in Kassel.

A devout Catholic, Meistermann worked for sacred rooms with great passion. With his art he wanted to praise the grace of God, looking for form-expressing solutions to glorify the Creator. However, he also criticized the Church, quarreling with those who thought they were in a position to claim special rights only because they administered the Christian faith: "I make propaganda for the Christian faith," he said, "but quite certainly, I do not make propaganda for the Church."

From 1967 to 1972, he was President of the German Artists Federation, requesting his colleagues in numerous papers and speeches to contribute their part to a more humane society.

In 1994, the Georg-Meistermann-Museum was opened in Wittlich.

References 

20th-century German painters
20th-century German male artists
German male painters
1911 births
1990 deaths
People from Solingen
Grand Crosses with Star and Sash of the Order of Merit of the Federal Republic of Germany
Kunstakademie Düsseldorf alumni
Academic staff of Kunstakademie Düsseldorf
German contemporary artists